Subi Jacob George (born in Kerala) is an Indian organic chemist, known for his work in the fields of supramolecular chemistry, materials chemistry and polymer chemistry. His research interests includes organic and supramolecular synthesis, functional organic materials, supramolecular polymers, chiral amplification, and hybrid materials.

Education and career
He obtained a bachelor's degree in chemistry and a master's degree in organic chemistry from Mahatma Gandhi University, Kerala. In 2004, he was awarded a PhD in organic chemistry from the National Institute for Interdisciplinary Science and Technology, Trivandrum.

Selected publications
 Supramolecular Materials for Opto-Electronics.
 Emerging solvent-induced homochirality by the confinement of achiral molecules against a solid surface.
 Coiled-Coil Gel Nanostructures of Oligo(p-phenylenevinylene)s: Gelation-Induced Helix Transition in a Higher-Order Supramolecular Self-Assembly of a Rigid π-Conjugated System
 Helicity Induction and Amplification in an Oligo(p-phenylenevinylene) Assembly through Hydrogen-Bonded Chiral Acids.
 Oligo(p-phenylenevinylene) Derived Organogels: A Novel Class of Functional Supramolecular Materials

See also 

 Ayyappanpillai Ajayaghosh
 Bert Meijer

References

External links 
 Profile on Google Scholar

Living people
Indian molecular biologists
Recipients of the Shanti Swarup Bhatnagar Award in Chemical Science
Indian scientific authors
Scientists from Kerala
Year of birth missing (living people)